Yanfeng Subdistrict is a subdistrict and the seat of Yanfeng District in Hengyang, Hunan, China. The subdistrict of Yanfeng has a village and six communities under its jurisdiction.

History
The subdistrict of Yanfeng was established in May 1955 and was named after Huiyan Peak, the first peak of Mount Heng. In 1958, it was reorganized as Yanfeng Subdistrict Branch of the Yanfeng People's Commune. In 1965, Damatou Subdistrict Branch was incorporated to it. In May 1966, it was renamed to Hongwei Subdistrict Branch. In 1971, Hongwei Subdistrict was established. In 1981, The subdistrict of Hongwei was restored to the name of Yanfeng.

Subdivisions
In 2014, Yanfeng Subdistrict administered nine communities of Daweiping, Jielong, Yudetang, Yuhuating, Xiangyinling, Yanfenglu, Lijiachong, Xinjiacun and Dangjiacun, and Yuedong Village. Through the merger of village-level divisions in 2015, its division was reduced to seven from 10, it has six communities and a village under its jurisdiction.

6 communities
 Lijiachong Community
 Xiangyinling Community
 Xinhuacun Community
 Yannangui Community
 Yudetang Community
 Yuhuating Community

a village
 Yuedong Village

References

Yanfeng District
Subdistricts of Hunan